Chaenothecopsis vainioana is a species of lichenicolous fungus in the family Caliciaceae that is found in Europe. It was first formally described by Czech lichenologist Josef Nádvorník in 1940 as a member of the genus Calicium. The specific epithet honours Finnish lichenologist Edvard August Vainio. Leif Tibell transferred it to genus Chaenothecopsis in 1979. Calicium vainioanum has been reported growing on Arthonia, Lecanactis abietina, and Calicium salicinum.

References

Eurotiomycetes
Fungi described in 1940
Fungi of Europe
Taxa named by Josef Nádvorník